Franco Rossi (19 April 1919, Florence – 5 June 2000, Rome) was an Italian film screenwriter and director, mainly known for having directed the six-hour Italian-German-British-Swiss TV mini-series Quo Vadis? in 1985.

Biography
Rossi was born in Florence, Italy. He studied law and then began to work on theatre. He was assistant director of Mario Camerini, Luis Trenker, Renato Castellani, Aldo Vergano.  Rossi made his debut as a director with the crime thriller I Falsari. He went on to have his first success with  Il seduttore, starring by Alberto Sordi, and among Rossi's other films were The Woman in the Painting (Amici per la pelle, 1955), Odissea Nuda (1961), Three Nights of Love (1964), an episode of Le bambole (1965), and Porgi l'altra guancia with Bud Spencer in (1974).

Rossi was one of the first established Italian film directors also doing work for television, being one of the three directors for the 1968 mini-series L'Odissea. His largest TV undertaking was directing the international co-production of the six-hour mini-series Quo Vadis? in 1985.

Filmography
Rossi was involved in the direction of 32 feature films or TV films/TV mini-series between 1952 and 1994, according to the Internet Movie Database.
 
1950: I Falsari
1952: Solo per te Lucia
1953: The Counterfeiters
1954: Il seduttore
1955: Amici per la pelle
1958: Amore a prima vista
1958: Calypso
1959: Death of a Friend
1959: Everyone's in Love (supervisor)
1961: Nude Odyssey
1962: Smog
1964: Controsesso (segment "Cocaina di domenica")
1964: High Infidelity (segment "Scandaloso")
1964: Three Nights of Love (segment "La moglie bambina")
1965: I complessi (segment "Il complesso della schiava nubiana")
1965: Le bambole (segment "La minestra")
1966: Make Love, Not War
1967: Le streghe (segment "La siciliana")
1967: Una rosa per tutti
1968: Caprice Italian Style (segment "Viaggio di lavoro")
1968: L'Odissea (TV mini-series)
1969: Youth March
1971: Eneide (TV serial)
1974: Il giovane Garibaldi (TV mini-series)
1974: Two Missionaries / Turn the Other Cheek
1976: Pure as a Lily
1977: Come una rosa al naso
1977: L'altra metà del cielo
1982: Storia d'amore e d'amicizia (TV series)
1985: Quo Vadis? (TV mini-series)
1987: Lo scialo (TV mini-series)
1987: Un bambino di nome Gesù (TV movie)
1994: Michele va alla guerra (TV movie)

References

External links

1919 births
2000 deaths
Film people from Florence
Italian film directors
20th-century Italian screenwriters
Italian male screenwriters
20th-century Italian male writers